Oxalophagus is a genus of bacteria belonging to the Bacillota. Up to now, only one species of this genus is known, Oxalophagus oxalicus

See also
Oxalophagus oxalicus

References

Paenibacillaceae
Monotypic bacteria genera
Bacteria genera